Jay Baker may refer to:

 Jay Baker (actor) (born 1961), American actor and producer
 Jay Baker (rugby union) (born 1991), Welsh rugby union player
 Jay Baker, American sheriff for Cherokee County, Georgia involved in the 2021 Atlanta spa shootings

See also
 Jay Bakker (born 1975), American pastor and author